Keith Campbell may refer to:
 Keith Campbell (ice hockey) (1909–1981), Canadian ice hockey player
 Keith Campbell (motorcyclist) (1931–1958), Australian motorcycle road racer
 Keith Campbell (philosopher) (born 1938), Australian philosopher
 Keith Campbell (cricketer) (born 1943), New Zealand cricketer
 Keith Campbell (biologist) (1954–2012), British biologist, led team that cloned Dolly the sheep
 Keith Campbell (artist) (born 1964), American artist, known as Scramble Campbell
 Keith Campbell (rugby league), Australian rugby league footballer
 W. Keith Campbell, American social psychologist
 Keith Campbell, Irish racing driver